Greene Shadrach Washington Lewis was a leader among African Americans and a state legislator in Alabama during the Reconstruction era 1868–1876. He represented Perry County, Alabama.

The Montgomery Advertiser quoted him appealing for equal rights for African Americans as legislative fights in Alabama and the U.S. Congress developed. The paper and Democrats saw such Radical Republican proposals as a force to unite white voters against Republicans and their efforts to end segregation and discrimination.

On March 4, 1873, he gave a speech addressing the civil rights bill before the house starting with a jab at the Democrats and demagogue Republicans who tried first to postpone the bill indefinitely.

The Livingston Journal published in Livingston, Alabama called for action from Democrats as it described a threat to large cotton belt landowners and claimed that in the last session of the house in 1874 Lewis called for the raising of taxes to a level high enough to force the large landowners to sell, enabling him and those like him to buy.

He was a Perry County, Alabama delegate to the 1875 Alabama Constitutional Convention. Greene was listed as a district delegate for the 1876 Republican National Convention.

See also
African-American officeholders during and following the Reconstruction era

References

African-American politicians during the Reconstruction Era
19th-century American politicians
Date of birth missing
Date of death missing
Republican Party members of the Alabama House of Representatives
African-American state legislators in Alabama
People from Perry County, Alabama